Adopted is a 2009 American independent mockumentary film starring comedian Pauly Shore as himself "going to Africa to adopt a child, à la Madonna and Angelina Jolie." The film marks Shore's third turn as a writer, director, and producer.

Plot
According to Dan Persons of The Huffington Post,

Cast
Pauly Shore - Himself

Production
The film was shot in South Africa in 2007 while Pauly Shore had been visiting the country. The idea for the film had come to him during the same visit and he had his crew members flown in to shoot the film. He "storyboarded the entire film in his hotel room, and a casting agent sent along a few “orphans” for the shoot." Adopted itself was then filmed within a period of only a few weeks.

References

External links

2009 comedy films
2009 films
American comedy films
American mockumentary films
Films scored by the Newton Brothers
Films about orphans
2000s English-language films
2000s American films